Vincent Rottiers (born 17 June 1986) is a French actor. He has appeared in more than thirty films since 2002.

He is the older brother of actor Kévin Azaïs.

Filmography

References

External links 
 

1986 births
Living people
People from Évry, Essonne
French male film actors
French male television actors
21st-century French male actors